Puffed grains are grains that have been expanded ("puffed") through processing. They have been made for centuries with the simplest methods like popping popcorn. Modern puffed grains are often created using high temperature, pressure, or extrusion.

People eat puffed grains in many ways, but it can be as simple as puffed grain alone and with sugar or salt for taste. Commercial products such as corn flakes and Corn Pops mix many ingredients into a homogeneous batter. The batter is then formed into shapes then toasted and/or extruded. This causes them to rise, but not puff or pop. Puffed grains can be  healthful if plain, but when other ingredients are mixed with them they may lose some of their health benefits.

Puffed grains are popular as breakfast cereals and in the form of rice cakes. While it is easy to recognize that cereals came from whole grains, the expansion factor for rice cakes is even greater, and the final product is somewhat more homogeneous.

History
The oldest puffed grain was found in west-central New Mexico in 1948 and 1950. Ears of popcorn were found that were up to 4,000 years old. These pieces of puffed grain were smaller than a penny to two inches in size and can be made in a similar way to popping popcorn.

Rice has been puffed since ancient times using a technique called hot salt frying in which parboiled rice (e.g. steamed and then dried) is puffed by preheated salt.

The modern process of making puffed grains was invented by Dr. Alexander P. Anderson in 1901 in Red Wing, Minnesota. He was doing an experiment dealing with the effect of heat and pressure on corn starch granules where he put them in six glass tubes, sealed them, and put them in an oven until they changed color. When Dr. Anderson took them out and cracked them open an explosion happened; he had made the corn starch turn into a puffed, white mass.
Dr. Anderson's invention of puffed grain was first introduced at the World's Fair in St. Louis in 1904. The puffed grain was shot from a battery of eight guns and on a poster, it was called “The Eighth Wonder of the World.”

Manufacture
Puffed rice can be produced using the simple but effective method of hot salt frying. Salt is heated in a pan until it is hot enough to pop rice added to it within seconds. Parboiled or dried pre-cooked rice is added to the heated contents of the pan and stirred. Puffing starts almost immediately and completes in less than a minute and the rice is scooped out by a sieve.

High pressure puffed grain is created by placing whole grains under high pressure with steam in a containment vessel. When the vessel's seal is suddenly broken, the entrained steam then flashes and bloats the endosperm of the kernel, increasing its volume to many times its original size.

Puffed rice or other grains are occasionally found as street food in China, Korea (called "ppeong twigi" 뻥튀기), and Japan (called "pon gashi" ポン菓子), where hawkers implement the puffing process using an integrated pushcart/puffer featuring a rotating steel pressure chamber heated over an open flame. The great booming sound produced by the release of pressure serves as advertising.

Manufacturing puffed grain by venting a pressure chamber is essentially a batch process.  To achieve large-scale efficiencies, continuous-process equipment has been developed whereby the pre-cooked cereal is injected into a high pressure steam chamber.  It then exits the steam chamber via a Venturi tube to an expansion chamber, where the puffed cereal is collected and conveyed to the next process step.  These devices, generally called stream puffing machines, were perfected in the latter half of the 20th century in Switzerland and Italy, but are now available from manufacturers in China as well.

Puffable foods

Examples

Puffed grain foods

Snacks and food products made from puffed grain include:
Amaranth
 Alegría  – Mexico
Corn (maize) (Popcorn)
Bamba - Israel
 Buffies - Palestine
Cheese puffs - U.S.A.
Cornick - Philippines
Corn Pops
Pasankalla - Bolivia
Popcorn
Millet
Awaokoshi, Japan - a puffed millet based sweet
Rice
 Ampaw - Philippines
 Bhelpuri  - Indian subcontinent
 Muri  - Indian subcontinent
 Puffed rice (i.e. Rice Krispies)
 Toffee Crisp - sweet made by Nestlé
Wheat
 Golden Crisp, Honey Smacks USA - breakfast cereal 
 Sugar Puffs UK - breakfast cereal 
Other
 Yeot-gangjeong - Korea
Rainbow Drops UK - puffed maize and rice sweets
Maná - Peru - Puffed pasta, corn, or wheat kernels
Moong dal - puffed mung beans

Puffed dough foods
 Corn puff
 Cheese puffs (corn)
 Kix (cereal)

References

External links

 Research notebooks and papers of the inventor of the process of puffing rice and starches, Alexander P. Anderson, are available for research at the Minnesota Historical Society

Breakfast cereals
Dried foods
Food technology
Articles containing video clips
Rice crackers

it:Riso soffiato
zh:米香